Filing system  may refer to:
Filing cabinet, a piece of office furniture
File system, a method of storing and organizing computer files and their data
Sorting, any process of arranging items systematically
Taxonomy (general), the science and practice of classification